The Volvo V40 is a small family car (C-segment in Europe) manufactured and marketed by Volvo Cars from 2012 to 2019. It was unveiled at the 2012 Geneva Motor Show, and was on sale in Europe and the United Kingdom between 2012 and 2019.

Models

V40
The V40 was designed by American Chris Benjamin, the interior is the work of Pontus Fontaeus, and was the last Volvo to be designed under Steve Mattin, before he departed the company.  It is built on the Global C platform with modifications to the electric power steering, and revised spring and damper settings.

The engine lineup at launch are: two petrol engines; a 1.6 litre EcoBoost I4 producing either 150 or 180 hp, dependent on specification, and a 2.5 litre Volvo B525 I5 producing 254 hp, and two diesel engines; a 1.6 litre PSA Peugeot Citroën / Ford Duratorq engine, which produces 115 hp, whilst only emitting 94 g/km of CO2, and a 2.0 litre I5 Volvo diesel engine available in two versions, 150 hp and 177 hp. In some countries, the V40 T5 uses a 2.0 litre I5 (B5204T9) producing 213 hp @ 6000 rpm and 300 nm from 2,700 to 5,000 rpm.

From the model year of 2014, Volvo has begun fitting its in-house developed Drive E (VEA) diesel and petrol engines to the V40. As of January 2015, these engines are available in the new V40 D4 (replacing the previous five cylinder D4) and V40 T5 (replacing the petrol five cylinder T5). Also available is the IntelliSafe safety precrash system.

These new engines replace the older, but identically branded, five cylinder engines. After introduction of the VEA D4 and T5, the 1.6 D2 and 2.0 five cylinder D3 are replaced with VEA 2.0 D2 and D3 engines. The 1.6 EcoBoost and 2.0 five cylinder are replaced with VEA 2.0 T2, T3, and T4 engines. For some petrol automatic models, a de stroked version of the VEA 2.0, with 1.5 litre displacement, is used for T2 and T3.

Volvo V40 Cross Country (2013–2019)
The Cross Country is a version of the Volvo V40 with protective body panels, bigger wheels and tyres along with an increased ride height. Its T4 and T5 petrol variants feature Haldex Gen-5 All Wheel Drive as an option, along with hill descent control. The V40 Cross Country is equipped with more powerful engines than the regular V40.

2016 facelift
A facelifted V40 made an appearance. This new version of the V40 includes the Thor's hammer headlights on all variants of V40, as featured on the XC90 II, S90 II and V90 II. Also added the option opened for straw patterns on the interior seats.

Engines

From 2012 to 2014: Two petrol engines, a 1.6 litre EcoBoost I4 producing 120, 150 and 180 hp, according to specifications and a 2.5 litre five cylinder (last evolution of the T5 VME) producing 254 hp. Two diesel engines, a 1.6 litre Ford Duratorq, which produces 115 hp, a 2.0 litre five cylinder Volvo, developing 150 hp (D3) or 177ch (D4).

2014 to 2015: Two petrol engines, a 1.6 litre EcoBoost I4 producing 120, 150 and 180 hp, according to specifications and a 2.0 litre (VEA) producing 245 hp. Three diesel engines, a 1.6 litre Ford Duratorq, which produces 115 hp, a 2.0 liter five cylinder Volvo developing 150 hp (D3) and a 2.0 litre (VEA) four cylinder with 190 hp (D4).

2015 to date: Two petrol engines, a 1.5 litre (VEA) producing 122 and 150 hp used only with automatic transmissions, according to specifications and a 2.0 litre (VEA) producing 122, 152, 190, or 245 hp used with manual or automatic transmissions. One diesel engine, a 2.0 litre (VEA) producing 120, 150 and 190 hp, according to specifications, used with manual or automatic transmission.

The 1.5 petrol VEA is a de stroked version of the 2.0 petrol VEA, with matching bores of 82.0mm, but the 1.5 having a stroke of 70.9mm compared to the 2.0 stroke of 93.2mm

Awards
 Best Executive Hatch, at the Scottish Car of the Year awards in 2012, which was held in Glasgow, Scotland on 14 October 2012.
 Auto Express Safety Award 2013, held at Grand Connaught Rooms, London on 2 July 2013.
 Best Medium Family Car and 2013 Car of the Year, by the motoring website Carsite.co.uk on 2 July 2013.

References

V40
Front-wheel-drive vehicles
Compact cars
Cars introduced in 2012
Hatchbacks
Ford C1 platform